A magic circle is a ritually defined space in a number of magical traditions.

Magic circle or Magic Circle may also refer to:
 Magic circle (mathematics), an arrangement of natural numbers on circles such that the sum of the numbers on each circle and the sum of numbers on each diameter are identical
 Magic circle (social), a concept used in sociology and psychology
 Magic circle (virtual worlds), a membrane enclosing virtual worlds
 Magic Circle (law firms), a group of leading London law firms
 Offshore magic circle, a group of law firms practicing in offshore jurisdictions
 The Magic Circle (organisation), a British organisation dedicated to stage magic
 Magic Circle (album), a 2005 album by Wizard
 The Magic Circle (Waterhouse paintings), two 1886 paintings by John William Waterhouse
 The Magic Circle (video game)
 Magic Circle Music, a record label founded by Manowar's bassist Joey DeMaio in 2003
 Magic Circle Festival, a music festival founded in 2007 by Joey DeMaio, headlined by Manowar
 Sala gang or Den Magiska Cirkeln, a 1930s Swedish criminal and occult organization
 The Magic Circle (book), a 1998 novel by Katherine Neville
 The Magic Circle, a 1993 novel by Donna Jo Napoli

See also
 Circle of Magic, a series of fantasy novels by Tamora Pierce